Dongaata is a 1997 Indian Telugu-language drama film directed by Kodi Ramakrishna. It stars Jagapati Babu, Soundarya, Suresh, Ritu Shivpuri, with music composed by Bharadwaj. It is produced by Dr. K. L. Narayana under the Sri Durga Arts banner and presented by S. Gopal Reddy. The film was inspired by the English film French Kiss (1995), which was remade in Hindi later on as Pyaar To Hona Hi Tha (1998).

Plot
The film begins in a village where Subbalakshmi a naive woman endears her cousin Prakash Rao. Prakash Rao is brought forth by her father to knit him with Subbalakshmi. Presently, he moves to the city for higher studies. Thereafter, he didn’t show up for her. Perturbed Subbalakshmi proceeds to the city by lying to her father that she is going on a tour. On her train journey, she is acquainted with a thief Raju who has stolen a diamond necklace that he hides in Subbalakshmi’s bag to sneak from Police.

ACP Vikram shadows Raju to recover the necklace. Besides, Raju follows Subbalakshmi like white on rice for the bag. Therein, he rescues her from several pitfalls and also supports her to find the whereabouts of Prakash Rao. During that time, Raju starts liking her but maintains silence because of her sweetheart towards her cousin. Anyhow, Subbalakshmi succeeds in locating Prakash Rao where she gets blindsided and collapses viewing Prakash Rao’s close intimacy with a tycoon Lavanya. In reality, Prakash Rao is a swindler who exploited Subbalakshmi to hit the top. Presently, he is behind Lavanya’s wealth. At that point, Prakash Rao manipulates the situation, convinces Subbalakshmi, and sends her back when Raju again accompanies her. On the way, Subbalakshmi fortuitously meets Prakash Rao’s friend Prasad who reveals the diabolic shade of his friend. Being cognizant of it, Subbalakshmi tries to commit suicide when Raju bars her and words to rectify Prakash Rao.

Right now, locating Prakash Rao, Raju & Subbalakshmi reaches Jaipur. Herein, Raju turns her into a modern girl. At that juncture, he gets stunned to find the necklace in hands of Subbalakshmi which she has hidden to seek his help. Currently, they make a friendship with Lavanya that frightens Prakash Rao. Moreover, Raju develops a close bond with Lavanya. So, enranged Prakash Rao warns Subbalakshmi, accuses her character, and tries to kill her. However, she is saved by ACP Vikram when she handovers the necklace to him, pleads to quit Raju, and also expresses her present love towards Raju which she hesitated to reveal. Meanwhile, Lavanya necks out Prakash Rao being aware of his true face. So, he reaches Subbalakshmi trying to con her once again but she discards him and moves to her village. At last, Raju learns about Subbalakshmi’s love through ACP Vikram, rushes to the railway station, and confesses that he loves her too. Finally, the movie ends on a happy note with the union of Raju and Subbalakshmi.

Cast

Jagapati Babu as Raju
Soundarya as Subbalakshmi
Suresh as Prakash Rao
Ritu Shivpuri as Lavanya
Kota Srinivasa Rao as Subbalakshmi's father
Brahmanandam as Constable
Sudhakar as Paropakari Papanna, a thief
Sarath Babu as ASP Vikram
Babu Mohan as a pimp
Mallikarjuna Rao as Ambothula Appa Rao
M. Balayya as Raju's father
Subhalekha Sudhakar as Prasad, Prakash's friend
Ananth Babu as Hotel owner
Gautam Raju as SI
Naamala Murthy
Gadiraju Subba Rao
Annuja
Alphonsa in a special appearance in the song "Lallaguda Mallesha"
Priya as Subbalakshmi's friend
Ragini as Radha
Neelima
Dubbing Janaki as Subbalakshmi's mother

Music 

The music was composed by Bharadwaj and released on the Supreme Music Company.

Reception 
The film was reviewed by Zamin Ryot. A critic from Andhra Today said that "The movie has many drawbacks and instead of covering them up, the director harped on them, and made the movie drag and boring".

References

1997 films
1990s Telugu-language films
Indian romantic drama films
1997 romantic drama films
Films directed by Kodi Ramakrishna
Films scored by Bharadwaj (composer)
Films set in Rajasthan
Films shot in Rajasthan
Indian remakes of American films